Roulston is a surname. Notable people with the surname include:

Ben Roulston, English record producer
Hayden Roulston (born 1981), New Zealand cyclist
Rolly Roulston (1911–1983), Canadian ice hockey player
Tom Roulston (born 1957), Canadian ice hockey player